Ásta Birna Gunnarsdóttir (born 29 October 1984) is an Icelandic team handball player. She plays on the Icelandic national team, and participated at the 2011 World Women's Handball Championship in Brazil.

References

1984 births
Living people
Asta Birna Gunnarsdottir
Asta Birna Gunnarsdottir